Roy Hodgson  (born 9 August 1947) is a former English football manager and player.

He managed 22 different teams in eight countries, beginning in Sweden with Halmstads BK in the 1976 season. He later guided the Switzerland national team to the last 16 of the 1994 World Cup and qualification for Euro 1996; Switzerland had not qualified for a major tournament since the 1960s. From 2006 to 2007, he managed the Finland national team, guiding them to their highest-ever FIFA ranking of 33rd place and coming close to qualifying for a major tournament for the first time in their history. He managed the England national team from May 2012 to June 2016. Other clubs that Hodgson has managed include Inter Milan, Blackburn Rovers, Malmö FF, Grasshoppers, FC Copenhagen, Udinese, Fulham, Liverpool, West Bromwich Albion, and Crystal Palace. Hodgson retired from football management after leaving  club Watford in May 2022.

Hodgson served several times as a member of UEFA's technical study group at the European Championships and was also a member of the FIFA technical study group at the 2006 World Cup. Hodgson speaks five languages and has worked as a television pundit in several of the countries in which he has coached.

Early life
Hodgson was born in Croydon, Surrey. His mother was a baker in the town, and his father, Bill, a Newcastle United fan, worked as a bus driver south of the River Thames. Hodgson's family lived in the same building as Steve Kember, one of Hodgson's schoolmates at John Ruskin Grammar School. The two played in the school football team, a side which also included Lennie Lawrence. Bob Houghton, who would go on to play a prominent part in Hodgson's career, joined the school in the sixth form.

Playing career
Hodgson was a moderately successful youth player with Crystal Palace, but was never able to break into the first team. After leaving Crystal Palace he played non-league football for several years with Tonbridge and Gravesend & Northfleet. At the age of 23, he completed training to gain his full coaching badge. He then joined Maidstone United, where he played and also served as assistant manager to Bob Houghton.

In 1972, after a year at Maidstone, he moved to Ashford Town (Kent), while also working as a PE teacher at Alleyn's School in south London. The following year, he moved to Pretoria, South Africa to play for Berea Park, despite the sporting boycott of South Africa in effect at the time. In 1974 Hodgson returned to England for his final playing spell, joining Carshalton Athletic. Again he supported himself by teaching, this time at Monks Hill Comprehensive.

Managerial career

Halmstad
Hodgson started his managerial career in 1976 at Allsvenskan side Halmstads BK, having been recommended by then-Malmö FF manager Bob Houghton. Hodgson spent five years at Halmstad, winning the league championship in 1976 and 1979. His success with Halmstad in 1976 is considered one of the biggest surprises of all time in Swedish football. The year before, Halmstad struggled against relegation, surviving on just goal difference and before the 1976 campaign began they were almost universally tipped for relegation. Hodgson himself says that "my greatest achievement would have to be the water-into-wine job at Halmstads BK."

Bristol City
In 1980, he moved to Bristol City in his native England, where he was assistant manager to Bob Houghton from 1980 to 1982 and manager from January to April 1982. Due to the club's financial problems he was largely unsuccessful and was dismissed after four months in charge. Commenting later on his time at Bristol City, Hodgson said: "Bristol City was nothing short of a disaster in that we had only been there for a matter of weeks before the banks started to pull the rug from underneath the club. My job when I eventually took over, as caretaker manager, was quite simply to carry on in the aftermath of all the players leaving the club and just fulfilling the fixtures."

Oddevold, Örebro
In 1982, Hodgson moved back to Sweden to take over second-tier side IK Oddevold part-way through the 1982 season. Hodgson could not save the club from relegation as they finished 11th, one point off safety. In 1983, he moved to fellow Division 2 side Örebro SK. In his first season, Örebro finished third. In his second season, the club finished first but the missed out on promotion to Allsvenskan after losing in the play-off to Mjällby AIF.

Malmö FF

In 1985, he took over at Malmö FF, which he led to five consecutive league championships, two Swedish championships (at the time the Swedish championship was decided through play-offs) and two Swedish Cups. His team took part regularly in European competitions: the Intertoto Cup, the European Cup and the UEFA Cup.  In the 1986–87 European Cup Winners' Cup, they beat Apollon Limassol in the first round and Tirana in the second round, losing to Ajax in the quarter finals. In the 1987–88 European Cup, Malmö were eliminated in the first round by Anderlecht. In the 1988–89 UEFA Cup, Malmö beat Torpedo Moscow in the first round after extra time and lost to the club Hodgson would manage seven years later, Inter Milan, in the second round. Narrowly losing 1–0 at home, they secured a 1–1 draw at the San Siro. Hodgson's greatest continental achievement at Malmö came the following year in the 1989–90 European Cup, knocking Inter out in the first round, winning 1–0 at home and drawing 1–1 at the San Siro. In the second round, Malmö lost to Mechelen. Due to his successful time at Malmö, Hodgson is still highly appreciated by the club's fans who have unofficially named a section of the Stadion "Roy's Hörna" (Roy's Corner).
Hodgson continues to be held in high regard at Malmö, where he is known as "Royson".

Influence on Swedish football
His early coaching career was closely linked to that of his friend Bob Houghton; they worked together at Maidstone, Stranraer and Bristol City and they both worked in Swedish football at the same time. Houghton moved to Sweden with Malmö in 1974 and two years later installed Hodgson at Halmstad. The pair are credited with transforming football in Sweden and bringing in zonal marking for the first time to Swedish football. Swedish teams at the time were influenced by German football and used a sweeper with three or five in defence, favouring man-marking. The two were known in Sweden as English Roy and English Bob.

Besides zonal marking, the defence pressed hard and maintained a high offside line. Their teams counter-attacked with long passes played in behind the opposition's defence. Instead of playing with a team that was very spread out from one end of the field to the other, with a libero who stayed in his penalty area and a centre-forward who never tracked back, they set up a system of zonal defence, a back four, players pushing up and getting the ball forward into the final area much more quickly. Houghton and Hodgson had considerable success, winning five out of six Swedish titles between 1974 and 1979 with Malmö reaching the 1979 European Cup Final, losing 1–0 against Nottingham Forest.

Neuchâtel Xamax
Malmö offered Hodgson a lifetime contract, but he declined, saying later that "moving to another place seemed exciting. The decision was also financial. Swedish taxes were so high that even if you were being paid reasonable money, after losing 65% in tax there wasn't a lot left." Hodgson moved to Swiss side Neuchâtel Xamax in July 1990. In his first season in charge, Xamax finished third in both the league and the subsequent championship play-off league, qualifying for the 1991–92 UEFA Cup. In the following season, Xamax finished fifth in the league and then finished second in the championship play-off league, missing out on the title to Sion by just two points. In Europe, he led Xamax to a 2–0 win on aggregate over Floriana and then a 5–2 aggregate win over Celtic. In the third round, Xamax were drawn against Real Madrid and they won their home tie 1–0 but were eliminated after a 4–0 defeat at the Bernabéu.

Switzerland
Hodgson took over as manager of the Switzerland national team from Uli Stielike on 26 January 1992. Stielike had been the first Swiss coach to have a winning record, winning 13 of the 25 games he was in charge of. As Hodgson was succeeding Stielike at the national level, Stielike took over the job Hodgson had just vacated at club level with Swiss Super League side Neuchâtel Xamax.

Switzerland had not qualified for a major international tournament since the 1966 World Cup. Hodgson took the Schweizer Nati to the 1994 World Cup, losing only one game during qualification, from a group that included Italy, Portugal and Scotland. The campaign, in which the Swiss came one point behind Italy, resulted in them rising to third in the FIFA World Rankings.

In the finals in the United States, the Swiss finished as runners-up in Group A alongside Romania, Colombia and the host team. They drew 1–1 with the Americans in their opening game in the Pontiac Silverdome; the first indoor World Cup game was played in extreme heat, and he admitted to not preparing for the conditions. The Swiss defeated a strong Romania team 4–1, qualifying for the Round of 16, where they lost 3–0 to Spain due to changing to an attacking formation after conceding an early goal.

The Swiss qualified for Euro 1996, again losing only one game during qualification to finish top of Group 3. With their place at Euro 1996 assured, Hodgson left immediately after qualification, on 15 November 1995, to join Italian club Inter Milan. He had in fact been doing both jobs from October of that year.

Part of Hodgson's success with the Swiss was to negotiate with the Swiss Super League for international players to train with him on Mondays and Tuesdays after playing for their clubs at the weekend, thus creating a club atmosphere in the national team.

Inter Milan
Before the European Championships, Hodgson joined Italian Serie A giants Inter Milan, where he worked from 1995 to 1997. With significant investment, he presided over a rebuilding phase. Inter had finished thirteenth and sixth in the seasons prior to his arrival. After a terrible start to the season that saw the team bottom of Serie A, Hodgson was brought in and guided the club to seventh place in the 1995–96 season, qualifying for the UEFA Cup. In an interview with FourFourTwo in a May 2005 issue, Roberto Carlos stated that he had difficulties with Hodgson throughout the 1995–96 season, and that his decision to leave Inter at the end of the season was largely due to Hodgson's refusal to field him in his preferred position, as a left-back, rather than in a more advanced position on the wing.

The 1996–97 season saw Hodgson leave Inter after guiding them to a third-place finish. He was replaced by Luigi Simoni whose side finished second in the league in the 1997–98 season and won the UEFA Cup. In an interview in 2009, Hodgson recalled his time at Inter: "We lacked stars, apart from Paul Ince. It wasn't the Inter we see today of household names. They weren't the best technically but physically they were like machines. The Premier League is like that now, but back then Italy was far ahead."

Hodgson managed to get his Inter team, containing Javier Zanetti, Youri Djorkaeff and Ince, through to the 1997 UEFA Cup Final, where they played Schalke 04. Given that Inter had a recent history of winning UEFA Cup finals, with victories in both 1991 and 1994, the Italian side started as favourites. It was the last UEFA Cup final to be played over two legs, with each club winning their home leg 1–0. When the German underdogs won the final in Milan on penalties, Inter fans pelted Hodgson with coins and lighters. The final was his last match in charge and he subsequently left to become the manager of Blackburn Rovers. In the same 2009 interview, Hodgson recalled how club president Massimo Moratti tried to talk him out of leaving: "I could have stayed. They offered me a new contract, but I had a feeling that they wanted a change. So I allowed my contract at Inter to run out. Even after I agreed to join Blackburn, Moratti did say to me: 'I don't know why you didn't stay here, but if that's what you want to do I won't stand in your way.'"

Speaking about Hodgson's time at Inter, club president Massimo Moratti said: "Roy Hodgson was an important person in the development of Inter Milan to the point we have reached today. He saved us at the right time. When he came we were in trouble and things appeared dark. He didn't panic, he was calm and made us calm. Disaster was averted at the most important time. Everyone at Inter will remember him for that and his contribution. He is considered by us all as an important person in our history. He left an endowment to this club that's important in our history."

Blackburn Rovers
Hodgson was one of three targets for Blackburn Rovers owner Jack Walker when Ray Harford resigned as their manager in October 1996, along with Terry Venables and Sven-Göran Eriksson. The following February, with his Inter contract due to expire in July, he agreed to move upon its expiration to join Rovers for three years. As Eriksson had backed out of an agreement to move to the club, Hodgson signed a contract including a six-figure penalty if he did not join when freed by Inter.

In the 1997–98 season, his first season in charge, Blackburn finished sixth, qualifying for the UEFA Cup and appearing to be in the ascendancy, especially as they had been outsiders in the title race for more than half of the season and Hodgson had been voted Premier League Manager of the Month on two occasions, in August and December 1997. However, the team's form collapsed dramatically in the second half of the season and it was only on the last day of the season that they secured a UEFA place.

Hodgson's second season with Blackburn did not match the relative success of the first, due to numerous injuries, dressing room unrest, and the failure to find an adequate replacement for departed central defender Colin Hendry. As a result, Blackburn had a poor start to the season. After Berti Vogts resigned as manager of the Germany national team in September 1998, Hodgson was contacted by the German FA to succeed him. Hodgson declined. When England manager Glenn Hoddle faced calls for him to resign following a much-criticised serialised diary in a national newspaper and poor results in the opening games of Euro 2000 qualification, Hodgson was the favourite among the media and the bookmakers to take over. Ultimately, Hoddle stayed in the job and Hodgson was dismissed two months later on 21 November 1998, with Blackburn bottom of the league table.

Hodgson later explained that Blackburn's owner gave him the chance to resign honourably, but he refused to do so, leaving the club with no option but to dismiss him. His final game was a home defeat by Southampton. He later complained that his failure at Blackburn tarnished his reputation in England, whilst his record on the continent should have made him comparable to Sir Alex Ferguson.

Return to Inter, Grasshoppers
In February 1999, Glenn Hoddle was dismissed as England manager and Hodgson was considered an outside chance for the job. Ultimately, it went to Kevin Keegan. Shortly after, Austria were beaten 9–0 by Spain in a Euro 2000 qualifier and manager Herbert Prohaska resigned. Hodgson was shortlisted to become the next manager, but the role went instead to Otto Barić. Hodgson then returned to Inter as technical director and had a brief second stint as caretaker before returning to Switzerland to coach Grasshoppers for a season. He led the team to a fourth-placed finish in the 1999–2000 Nationalliga A in both the league and the subsequent championship play-off league. After Kevin Keegan resigned as manager of the England national football team in October 2000, Hodgson was one of three shortlisted candidates to take over; however, after having agreed to move to FC Copenhagen prior to the FA showing interest in interviewing him for the position, he was obliged to refuse any offer and the job went to Sven-Göran Eriksson.

Copenhagen, Udinese
Hodgson moved to Denmark in July 2000 and became manager of F.C. Copenhagen, where he proved an instant success, taking a team that had finished seventh and eighth in the two previous seasons to the Superliga championship in the 2000–01 season – the club's first championship since 1993. His team also won the 2001 Danish Supercup. In 2001, he left Copenhagen to move to Serie A side Udinese. With the club in ninth place and in the quarter finals of the 2001–02 Coppa Italia, Hodgson was fired in December 2001 after less than six months in charge after allegedly stating that he regretted taking up the post. Newspapers quoted him saying: "Obviously I'm very happy to be back at this level of football, but I could have chosen a better club to come back to. It's an extremely strange club." Hodgson denied making the comments but later claimed that he wanted to leave so was happy to be dismissed. In January 2002, Hodgson was linked to the vacant managerial role at Shakhtar Donetsk.

United Arab Emirates
Hodgson took over as manager of the United Arab Emirates in April 2002, managing the senior and Olympic sides. Hodgson's reign began with six friendlies. The first two ended in defeat and the subsequent four were draws. Hodgson then successfully led the team through qualification to the 2004 Asian Cup as runners-up of their group. Before the Asian Cup took place, Hodgson led the team during the 16th Arabian Gulf Cup. He was dismissed in January 2004 after a fifth-placed finish in the round-robin tournament. Without him, the team went on to finish bottom of their group at the Asian Cup, collecting a single point. Speaking of his time as manager of the United Arab Emirates, Hodgson said: "That was a period where I didn't know where my career was going. But all these experiences enrich you and it was good to know I could get my message to players who many say are uncoachable. It's hard work; they're basically lazy. But I had them drilled and pressuring opponents almost like an English team. Most coaches who go there are just fannying around, but it's not my nature." In 2012, the president of the interim committee of the United Arab Emirates Football Association, Yousuf al-Serkal, said: "From what I remember of the period he was here, he didn't have a good opportunity of preparing his team for any tournament. There were no training camps and players were not made available to him. It must have been difficult for him to build the right atmosphere."

Viking
In July 2004, Hodgson moved to Norwegian club Viking, replacing manager Bjarne Berntsen, who resigned to become manager of the Norway women's national football team. The club had finished fifth in the season before Hodgson took over and finished ninth under Hodgson in their first season in their new stadium, Viking Stadion. They also qualified for the 2005–06 UEFA Cup through their UEFA Fair Play ranking. The following season, in the UEFA Cup, Viking progressed through two qualifying rounds, beating Rhyl and Austria Wien. In the group stage, Viking finished fourth, missing out on progressing to the knockout stage by just two points. The highlight of their campaign was a 1–0 victory over Monaco. In the 2005 Premier League, following a spell at the top of the table, Viking finished fifth, five points off top spot. Hodgson resigned in December 2005 to become manager of the Finland national football team.

Finland
Hodgson was to begin work with Finland in June 2006 but after resigning as manager of Viking in December 2005, he began the role early, in January 2006. Hodgson's first matches in charge were against Saudi Arabia and South Korea in a friendly tournament at the end of January. Finland played five more friendlies before qualification for UEFA Euro 2008 got under way, drawing three and losing two. Drawn in Group A, Finland, a country who have never qualified for a major tournament, narrowly failed to qualify. Their qualification campaign began well, winning three and drawing two of their opening five matches, leaving them briefly top of the table. Defeats to Azerbaijan and Serbia saw them fall from top spot. Wins against Belgium and Kazakhstan renewed their hopes of qualification but they drew their next three games 0–0. A subsequent friendly against Spain also finished 0–0. A win against Azerbaijan kept the chance of qualification possible and it was only when their final match against Portugal ended in a 0–0 draw that Finland were eliminated.

Although Hodgson's win ratio of just 27.3% was the worst of any Finland manager since 2000, this is attributable to his record in friendlies. Out of eight friendly matches, Finland drew five and lost three. All six of his wins came in official qualifying matches, allowing Finland to come fourth in their group with a respectable 24 points, finishing below third-placed Serbia on goal difference and missing out on qualification by just three points. Hodgson drew plaudits for his work with the team and Finland were praised for well-organised defending but criticised for inefficient attacking – five of Finland's 14 qualification games ended in 0–0 draws. In May 2007, when Lawrie Sanchez resigned as manager of the Northern Ireland national football team to manage Premier League side Fulham, Hodgson was considered for the role, but he committed himself to staying with Finland. Hodgson would go on to succeed Sanchez as manager of Fulham seven months later. Hodgson's contract expired at the end of November 2007 and although the Finnish FA expressed their willingness to extend it, he decided to move on. Prior to taking up an ambassadorial role at Inter, Hodgson was linked with the vacant Republic of Ireland manager's job. He was also considered an outside candidate to replace Steve McClaren as England manager, having been linked previously to the job after the departures of Glenn Hoddle and Kevin Keegan and given his international management record and nationality.

Fulham

On 28 December 2007, in a surprise appointment, Hodgson accepted the post of manager at struggling Premier League team Fulham, with his contract beginning on 30 December 2007. The club were 18th, two points from safety and had only won two Premier League games all season. Hodgson's first game in charge was the West London derby against Chelsea at Craven Cottage which his club lost, 2–1. Hodgson made half a dozen signings in the January transfer window, the most important proving to be centre half Brede Hangeland, who would go on to become a key player for the club and who Hodgson had managed at Viking. Hodgson initially endured a run of very poor results with the club, including being knocked out of the FA Cup on penalties after two draws against League One side Bristol Rovers. Apparently certainties for relegation to the Championship, Fulham picked up just nine points from Hodgson's first thirteen league games. However, a run of twelve points from the last five games of the season, including a 3–2 win over Manchester City after being 2–0 down with twenty minutes remaining, secured the Cottagers' survival, which was confirmed on the final day of the season with a 1–0 win over Portsmouth.

Ahead of the 2008–09 season, Hodgson made several important signings. Goalkeeper Mark Schwarzer and midfielder Zoltán Gera arrived on free transfers, as did teenage defender Chris Smalling, who would go on to be sold to Manchester United for £12 million. Other signings included striker Bobby Zamora and defender John Paintsil for a combined £6.3 million and striker Andy Johnson for £10.5 million. In the Premier League, Hodgson led Fulham to unprecedented success, guiding his side to seventh place in the Premier League, the club's highest ever finish and ensuring qualification for the new UEFA Europa League. Fulham also enjoyed a cup run, reaching the quarter finals of the FA Cup. The club received a number of additional awards from the Premier League, namely the Fair Play Award, the Behaviour of the Public Award and the Barclays Spirit Award for Hodgson. There were calls for Hodgson to be given the Premier League Manager of the Year award and he received much praise for the signings of Mark Schwarzer, Andy Johnson and Brede Hangeland and for the improvement in Bobby Zamora's performances. Hodgson's spell at Fulham greatly revived his reputation in England after his time in charge of Blackburn over a decade earlier, with renewed speculation linking him to the England job should Fabio Capello have left.

Players joining Fulham before the 2009–10 season included right back Stephen Kelly and midfielders Bjørn Helge Riise, Damien Duff and Jonathan Greening. Hodgson enjoyed a fantastic run in the Europa League. The club's campaign, which started in July 2009 in the third qualifying round, featured impressive performances in the group stage, including defeating Basel at the hostile St. Jakob-Park in the final group game to qualify for the knockout stage at the expense of the Swiss club. In the following rounds, Fulham went on to eliminate holders Shakhtar Donetsk 3–2 on aggregate, Italian runners-up Juventus 5–4 on aggregate and German champions Wolfsburg 3–1 on aggregate. The victory against Juventus was especially memorable. Fulham lost 3–1 in Turin and went 4–1 down on aggregate in the second minute of the second leg at Craven Cottage. However, a goal from Bobby Zamora, a brace from Zoltán Gera and a late winner from Clint Dempsey meant that Fulham won the tie 5–4 on aggregate. On 29 April 2010, Hodgson guided Fulham to their first major European final in their 130-year history, winning the home leg 2–1 after a 0–0 away draw to gain a 2–1 aggregate victory over Hamburg in the Europa League semi-final. In the final on 12 May at the HSH Nordbank Arena in Hamburg, Fulham played Spanish club Atlético Madrid. The game went to extra time at 1–1 after first-half goals from Diego Forlán and Simon Davies. With a penalty shoot-out looming and just four minutes remaining, Forlán scored again to win the game for Atlético Madrid. In the Premier League, the Europa League commitments showed as their League form became inconsistent. Fulham lost four of their first six games before losing only one of their following twelve. Five successive defeats preceded a run of five unbeaten. Three straight defeats were then followed by three unbeaten before their final four games garnered one win and three defeats, meaning the club finished twelfth, just four points off ninth place. The club also enjoyed another good run in the FA Cup, again reaching the quarter-final before losing the replay to Tottenham Hotspur.

In May 2010, Hodgson was voted the 2010 LMA Manager of the Year by a record margin. Hodgson received the award after a poll of coaches, including managers from the top four leagues in England. Two days later, his Fulham side lost the club's first European final 2–1 to Atlético Madrid.

On 30 June 2010, the Liverpool Echo reported that Hodgson would be named as the new Liverpool manager after the club had agreed a £2 million compensation deal with Fulham. The announcement came after weeks of speculation following the departure of Rafael Benítez.

Liverpool
On 1 July 2010, Hodgson was appointed as manager of Liverpool, signing a three-year contract. The appointment came against the backdrop of an unexpected candidacy bid from former Liverpool striker and manager and then-club ambassador Kenny Dalglish. Dalglish's application was rejected by the club, who publicly never gave a reason for their decision but it was suggested that he had been away from management for too long. Instead, Hodgson was chosen as the candidate that could use his extensive experience in management 'to steady the ship'. With the club up for sale at the time, Liverpool were likely to face some turbulent times, but Hodgson's appointment met with mixed reactions from fans. There were suggestions of insufficient experience with 'big clubs' despite his tenure at Inter and that he might struggle to manage high-profile players. Former Marseille and Juventus manager Didier Deschamps later claimed that he had been offered the job before Hodgson, but turned it down.

Having signed Milan Jovanović and Joe Cole, Hodgson's first game as manager was a friendly against one of his former clubs, Grasshoppers, on 21 July, which ended as a goalless draw. On 29 July, his first competitive game in charge was a 2–0 away win against FK Rabotnički in the Europa League. In the return leg at Anfield, Liverpool again won 2–0, winning the tie 4–0 on aggregate. Hodgson's first league game with Liverpool was against Arsenal, being denied a debut win only after a last minute own goal by Pepe Reina resulted in a draw. Hodgson made further signings in goalkeeper Brad Jones, defenders Danny Wilson and Paul Konchesky, midfielders Christian Poulsen and Raul Meireles, as well as re-signing full-back Fábio Aurélio, who had been released by the club earlier in the summer. Meanwhile, Benitez signings Albert Riera, Diego Cavalieri and Javier Mascherano were all sold, whilst Alberto Aquilani was loaned out to Juventus and Emiliano Insúa was loaned out to Galatasaray.

On 29 August, Hodgson achieved his first league win, defeating West Bromwich Albion 1–0 at Anfield.

After that, Liverpool had a series of poor results, one of which saw the club eliminated from the League Cup on 23 September by League Two strugglers Northampton Town at Anfield, losing on penalties. Prior to the home game against newly promoted Blackpool on 3 October, Hodgson responded to his critics, describing himself as "one of the most respected coaches in Europe" and said it was "insulting" to suggest he could not handle Liverpool's big-name players. Liverpool lost the game 2–1, leaving them third from bottom after seven games and Hodgson admitted that his side were potentially facing a relegation battle.

By late October, speculation was rife that Hodgson would be dismissed. Hodgson stated that he had no intention of resigning and responded aggressively to suggestions that Frank Rijkaard, who had recently been dismissed as manager of Galatasaray, would be appointed in his place. Three straight Premier League victories, including a 2–0 home win over league leaders Chelsea, reduced speculation as Liverpool returned to the top half of the table. New club owner John W. Henry stated his backing for Hodgson.

Hodgson left the club by mutual consent on the morning of 8 January 2011, with Kenny Dalglish announced as his replacement.

West Bromwich Albion
Hodgson was appointed head coach of West Bromwich Albion on 11 February 2011, signing a contract until June 2012. Hodgson replaced Roberto Di Matteo, who had been dismissed after a poor run of form which saw West Brom lose thirteen of their previous eighteen matches and slip to seventeenth in the table, only out of the relegation zone on goal difference.

Hodgson's first game in charge ended in a 1–1 home draw against West Brom's Black Country rivals Wolverhampton Wanderers. Hodgson helped West Brom to five wins and five draws from their twelve remaining games, including an important 2–1 win at The Hawthorns against Liverpool, a result that some in the media dubbed "Roy's Revenge". West Brom finished 11th in the final table – their highest league finish for three decades.

Despite having to deal with West Brom's notoriously frugal approach to the transfer market, Hodgson made several signings in the summer of 2011, replacing goalkeeping duo Boaz Myhill and Scott Carson with former Manchester United goalkeeper Ben Foster on loan from Birmingham City and drafting in Márton Fülöp from Ipswich Town on a free transfer. Experience and height was added to the backline in the form of Northern Ireland international Gareth McAuley on a free transfer and recently relegated Preston North End's player of the season Billy Jones also arrived to add cover at fullback. Prior to the start of the season, former Hawthorns hero Zoltán Gera also returned on a free transfer from Fulham and a summer-long chase for Shane Long was finally ended with the Irish international signing for an undisclosed fee reported to be in the region of £4million. Long joined the club in time to make a scoring début in the season's opener.

Following good performances against Manchester United and Chelsea in their opening two fixtures, Hodgson's usual 4–4–2 formation was replaced with a 4–4–1–1 or a 4–3–3 formation.

Despite his side being continually beset with injuries to key players and the season-long loss of Zoltan Gera to a cruciate ligament injury in only his second start after returning, Hodgson's side always remained well above the relegation zone until the Christmas period when successive 2–1 home defeats to newly promoted duo Swansea City and Norwich City as well as to bottom club Wigan Athletic saw them move within three points of eighteenth-place Bolton Wanderers.

With Hodgson repeatedly stating his ambition for the season was to ensure a third season of Premier League football for West Brom for the first time in almost thirty years, he once again raided Ipswich and Birmingham City for midfielder Keith Andrews and full back Liam Ridgewell respectively in the January transfer window. In February 2012, he led West Brom to three consecutive wins, beating local rivals Wolverhampton Wanderers 5–1 at Molineux and recording successive wins at The Hawthorns for the first time all season, beating Sunderland 4–0 and Chelsea 1–0. West Brom's form in the final third of the season saw them win six, draw three and lose five from a difficult run-in involving games against seven of the top eight teams. In West Brom's final win of the season they beat Liverpool again, this time at Anfield, their first win there since 1967.

On 29 April 2012, it was reported that Hodgson was approached by the FA for the vacant England manager job. He was appointed as England manager two days later but continued to manage West Brom until the end of the 2011–12 Premier League campaign, guiding the club to a tenth-placed finish, West Brom's highest top flight finish since 1981.

England

Appointment
After England manager Fabio Capello resigned, it had been widely reported in the British press that then-Tottenham Hotspur manager Harry Redknapp was favourite for the position. However, the FA chairman, David Bernstein, stated that, despite there being a shortlist of candidates, Hodgson was the only one approached for the position. On 1 May 2012, the Football Association appointed him as the manager of England after agreeing a four-year contract. He officially assumed the position on 14 May.

Euro 2012

Leading up to Euro 2012, Hodgson engendered controversy when he left former England captain Rio Ferdinand out of England's initial Euro 2012 squad. Hodgson would defend his decision to leave out Ferdinand as due to "footballing reasons", citing Ferdinand's lack of appearances for the national team, his last cap having come in June 2011 and also concerns over his fitness. Ferdinand's manager Sir Alex Ferguson agreed with Hodgson, saying that at the Euros, "you play something like a game every four days. Rio Ferdinand couldn't do that". Speculation was rife that Ferdinand was not selected due to Hodgson not wanting both Ferdinand and John Terry in the same dressing room when Terry was due to undergo trial in July for allegedly racially abusing Ferdinand's brother, Anton. After injury ruled centre-back Gary Cahill out of the squad, Hodgson elected to pick Liverpool full-back Martin Kelly over Ferdinand, leading to Ferdinand's representative Jamie Moralee accusing Hodgson of disrespecting Ferdinand. Hodgson said about the decision that "When it came to bringing another player in, I wasn't going to bring in a player of Rio's age, class, background and experience to be a cover player. I had to be convinced, if I was going to take Rio in my 23, he'd be one of the first names on the team sheet. I couldn't be convinced that would be the case".

In Hodgson's first game, a friendly on 26 May in Oslo, England beat Norway 1–0, the first win by an England side against Norway for 32 years. Hodgson's second game in charge, and his first game at Wembley Stadium, was a 1–0 win over Belgium on 2 June. Although England did not enjoy the higher percentage of possession, the signs were they would be a tough defensive unit to beat. In the build-up to Euro 2012, Hodgson added Ray Lewington, Gary Neville and goalkeeping coach Dave Watson to his coaching team.

It was widely reported in the build-up to Euro 2012 that, with England's so-called "Golden Generation" at an end, a squad hit by injuries and with Hodgson having only a matter of weeks to prepare for the tournament, expectations for the national team, usually quite high, were considerably lower than usual. Hodgson's first competitive game as England manager ended in a 1–1 draw with France in England's first Euro 2012 group stage match. England faced Sweden in the second group game, which England won 3–2. Down 2–1, Hodgson replaced James Milner with Theo Walcott, with Walcott scoring the equalising goal and then assisting Danny Welbeck's winner, in England's first ever competitive victory over Sweden. In England's final group match, starting in second place behind France and needing only to avoid defeat to qualify, Wayne Rooney, returning from suspension, scored the only goal as England beat co-hosts Ukraine 1–0. Combined with Sweden's shock 2–0 victory over France, the result meant England qualified as group winners with France finishing second. Winning the group meant that England played the runners-up of Group C, Italy, thus avoiding reigning World and European champions Spain.

In the quarter finals, England drew 0–0 with Italy, before going out 4–2 on penalties. Although Italy dominated possession throughout the match, Hodgson's side were praised for being defensively well-organised and hard to beat, and the team were reported to have either met or exceeded their expectations.

Under Hodgson's management England rose to third in the FIFA World Rankings, their highest ever position since the rankings were introduced in 1992.

2014 World Cup qualification
England were drawn in Group H of the European Zone of qualification for the 2014 FIFA World Cup, alongside Moldova, Montenegro, Poland, San Marino and Ukraine. They started the campaign on 7 September 2012 with a convincing 5–0 away win over Moldova, and in their second qualifier on 11 September the team drew 1–1 to Ukraine.

In a friendly at Wembley Stadium on 6 February 2013, England beat Brazil 2–1, their first win against the South American side for twenty-three years. England resumed World Cup qualifiers on 22 March when they thumped San Marino 8–0 at the Stadio Olimpico. The goals came from seven different scorers and included a brace for Jermain Defoe and a first England goal for Daniel Sturridge. The win was England's biggest since they beat Turkey 8–0 in October 1987.

In July 2013, the FA announced that Hodgson would take charge of the England under-21 side for one game, against the Scotland under-21s in a friendly on 13 August. England beat their rivals 6–0 at Bramall Lane.

On 15 October 2013, England beat Poland 2–0 at Wembley, with goals from Wayne Rooney and Steven Gerrard, to qualify unbeaten for the 2014 FIFA World Cup in Brazil. Hodgson said after the match that reaching the tournament was his proudest moment in football. After the Poland win Hodgson was criticised by Kick It Out for a half-time speech to Chris Smalling and Andros Townsend, in which he made a joke about a monkey and an astronaut. Townsend did not find the joke offensive and was surprised by the criticism.

2014 World Cup
On 12 May 2014, Hodgson announced his squad for the finals, stating, "I believe the squad can win the World Cup." The 23-man squad included Everton's Ross Barkley and Liverpool's Raheem Sterling, but not Ashley Cole, who announced his retirement from international football after missing out.

England lost to Italy 2–1 in their opening match of the World Cup on 14 June, and in their second match were beaten by Uruguay 2–1. Following Costa Rica's 1–0 defeat of Italy on 20 June, England were eliminated from the World Cup at the group stage for the first time since 1958. After the loss to Uruguay, Hodgson stated, "I don't have any intention to resign."
England finished their World Cup campaign on 24 June with a goalless draw against Costa Rica to finish bottom of Group D.

Euro 2016
Hodgson named Wayne Rooney as the new captain of England in August 2014, following the retirement of Steven Gerrard from international football. Hodgson's first match after the World Cup was a 1–0 win against Norway in an international friendly match at Wembley on 3 September 2014. During the match, England made only two shots on target. Hodgson was infuriated when asked about this, describing the statistic as "fucking bollocks". Former England player, Alan Shearer stated that he found the match dull, adding that "those who did go probably wish they hadn't."

Under Hodgson, England dropped to 20th in the FIFA World Rankings, their worst position since May 1996.

England started their Euro 2016 qualifying campaign with a 2–0 win against Switzerland, with Danny Welbeck scoring both goals. In March 2015, England won 4–0 against Lithuania, their fifth competitive win in a row to maintain their 100% record in qualifying for Euro 2016. On 5 September , England beat San Marino 6–0 away to qualify for Euro 2016. England concluded its qualification having won all ten of its matches becoming only the fifth national side to qualify for a European Championship with a 100% record, and the sixth instance of all time. Prior to the tournament, Hodgson was praised in the media for introducing several promising young players, and for giving a more offensive playing style to the team.

In the Euro 2016 tournament in France, England progressed from the group stage as runners-up to Wales, after drawing 0–0 with Slovakia. On 27 June, after England were knocked out by Iceland in the round of 16, Hodgson's contract as manager finished. Following the elimination, he endured media criticism for the team's negative performance, and for making several questionable selections and tactical decisions, such as the six changes made to the squad that had defeated Wales 2–1, which resulted in a 0–0 draw against Slovakia and a second-place finish in the group. He was also accused of failing to give the side sufficient preparation or an identity to their game.

Crystal Palace
On 12 September 2017, Hodgson was appointed manager of his boyhood club Crystal Palace, replacing Frank De Boer after signing a two-year contract with the South-London club. He was tasked with managing a Palace side that had lost their first four league games of the season without scoring a single goal. Despite losing his first three games in charge, a turnaround in form meant he led Crystal Palace to safety and an 11th-place finish in the league. No team had previously survived relegation from the top flight after losing their first seven games (itself a new Premier League record).

Crystal Palace finished the 2018–19 season on 49 points, equalling their best ever total in a single Premier League campaign. During it, in a match against Leicester City that Palace won 4–1, Hodgson beat Sir Bobby Robson's record as the oldest man to manage in the Premier League, at the age of 71 years and 198 days. In March 2020, he signed a contract extension, keeping him at the club until the end of the 2020–21 season.

On 18 May 2021, Hodgson announced that he would be leaving at the end of the season, having preserved Palace's place in the league. Asked about retirement, he said: "I really am stepping away from football for a while, but who knows what the future will be? It is a never-say-never moment. I've seen so many people retire with all the fanfare blazing, only to surface again somewhere in a fairly short period of time. I'd prefer not to do that."

Watford
On 25 January 2022, Hodgson returned to the Premier League when he was appointed as manager of Watford. He replaced Claudio Ranieri, who was dismissed the previous day with the club lying in 19th in the table, and signed a contract until the end of the 2021–22 season. In May 2022, Hodgson said that he would not be at the club after the end of the season and that he would not be seeking another managerial job in the Premier League. Watford were eventually relegated at the end of that season, finishing 19th on 23 points.

Personal life
Hodgson is married to Sheila, and together they have a son, Christopher. Hodgson is known to be a fan of the authors Sebastian Faulks, John Updike, Philip Roth and Saul Bellow. He is multilingual: In addition to his native English, he speaks fluent Swedish, German, Italian, and French.

Although Hodgson played for Berea Park in South Africa's white-only National Football League during the 1970s, he has stated his admiration for Nelson Mandela and coached a World XI team in a charity football event in Mandela's honour in August 1999. Upon his appointment as the manager of England's national football team in May 2012 he was asked about his time during the apartheid era; he stated that he only played in South Africa for footballing reasons, as did his teammates at the club and not because of a political belief.

Hodgson was made a Knight, First Class, of the Order of the Lion of Finland in September 2012. He received an Honorary Doctorate from the University of York on 22 January 2016.

In 2018, Hodgson was made a Freeman of the Borough of Croydon. He was made a Commander of the Order of British Empire (CBE) in 2022, receiving his medal from Prince William, Duke of Cambridge, the president of the Football Association. He reflected that "I think when you are recognised by your country for services to the sport that you've loved and served, I think you've got to regard that as the ultimate accolade".

FA commission
On 20 October 2013, Hodgson and Rio Ferdinand were appointed to The Football Association's commission to improve the state of the national game.

Managerial statistics

Honours
Hodgson was appointed Commander of the Order of the British Empire (CBE) in the 2021 Birthday Honours for services to football.

Manager
Halmstads BK
Allsvenskan: 1976, 1979

Örebro SK
Division 2 Norra: 1984

Malmö FF

 Swedish Champion: 1986, 1988
Allsvenskan: 1985, 1986, 1987, 1988, 1989
Svenska Cupen: 1985–86, 1988–89

Neuchâtel Xamax
Swiss Super Cup: 1990

Inter Milan
UEFA Cup runner-up: 1996–97

Copenhagen
Danish Superliga: 2000–01
Danish Super Cup: 2001

Fulham
UEFA Europa League runner-up: 2009–10

Individual
LMA Manager of the Year: 2010
Premier League Manager of the Month: August 1997, December 1997, October 2009, February 2010

Notes

References

External links

 
 Roy Hodgson: An in-depth profile LFC History
 Roy Hodgson Profile This is Anfield
 Roy Hodgson – Collected articles guardian.co.uk
 Answering reader's questions – BBC 2001

1947 births
Living people
Footballers from Croydon
People educated at John Ruskin Grammar School
English footballers
Association football defenders
Crystal Palace F.C. players
Tonbridge Angels F.C. players
Ebbsfleet United F.C. players
Maidstone United F.C. (1897) players
Ashford United F.C. players
Berea Park F.C. players
Carshalton Athletic F.C. players
English expatriate footballers
English expatriate sportspeople in South Africa
Expatriate soccer players in South Africa
English football managers
Halmstads BK managers
Bristol City F.C. managers
IK Oddevold managers
Örebro SK managers
Malmö FF managers
Neuchâtel Xamax FCS managers
Switzerland national football team managers
Inter Milan managers
Blackburn Rovers F.C. managers
Grasshopper Club Zürich managers
F.C. Copenhagen managers
Udinese Calcio managers
United Arab Emirates national football team managers
Viking FK managers
Finland national football team managers
Fulham F.C. managers
Liverpool F.C. managers
West Bromwich Albion F.C. managers
England national football team managers
England national under-21 football team managers
Crystal Palace F.C. managers
Watford F.C. managers
Allsvenskan managers
English Football League managers
Serie A managers
Danish Superliga managers
Eliteserien managers
Premier League managers
1994 FIFA World Cup managers
UEFA Euro 2012 managers
2014 FIFA World Cup managers
UEFA Euro 2016 managers
English expatriate football managers
English expatriate sportspeople in Sweden
English expatriate sportspeople in Switzerland
English expatriate sportspeople in Italy
English expatriate sportspeople in Denmark
English expatriate sportspeople in the United Arab Emirates
English expatriate sportspeople in Norway
English expatriate sportspeople in Finland
Expatriate football managers in Sweden
Expatriate football managers in Switzerland
Expatriate football managers in Italy
Expatriate football managers in Denmark
Expatriate football managers in the United Arab Emirates
Expatriate football managers in Norway
Expatriate football managers in Finland
Knights First Class of the Order of the Lion of Finland
Commanders of the Order of the British Empire
National Football League (South Africa) players